Stanley United Football Club were an English association football club which participated in the Northern League from 1910 to 1974. The club also participated in the Wearside League from 1988 to 2003. They reached the FA Cup First Round Proper in the 1954–55 season, losing 5–3 to Crook Town,

Honours
Northern League
Champions: 1945–46, 1961–62, 1963–64
Runners-up: 1962–63
Wearside League Division Two
Runners-up: 1995–96

Former players
1, Players that have played/managed in the Football League or any foreign equivalent to this level (i,e, fully professional league),
2, Players with full international caps,
3, Players that hold a club record or have captained the club,
 John Brown
 Harry Clarke
 Geoff Strong
 Reuben Vine
 Joe Wilson

References

1910 establishments in England
2003 disestablishments in England
Association football clubs established in 1910
Defunct football clubs in England
Association football clubs disestablished in 2003
Defunct football clubs in County Durham